Lives at Risk is a book about modern health care systems.  It examines the flaws of current health care systems and proposes reforms for the American health care system.  In doing so it examines twenty common assumptions about government involvement in health care systems which they argue are myths.  The book continues on to discuss the economics and politics behind health care in the United States, and proposes market based reforms.

Introduction 

It begins by examining how three fundamental facts about health care systems.

 The potential exists to spend the entire US GDP on health care in useful ways.
 As time goes on, Americans desire to spend more of their income on health care.
 The US has suppressed normal market forces in dealing with 1 and 2.

The authors contend that Americans could potentially spend their entire GDP on medical testing alone.
  
They further explain that as people become older and wealthier, they naturally spend more of their money on health care.

They explain how the suppression of normal market forces, in conjunction with the first two facts, has created the problems currently faced with health care in the United States and abroad.

Problems with national systems 

The authors examine whether countries other than the United States have been able to solve the problems listed above.  Since the stated goals of national health insurance are often to make health care available based on need rather than ability to pay, they state that

 national health care systems lead to rationing in the form of waiting lists
 access to health care is correlated with income under national systems
 too much money is spent on the healthy, while the most critically sick are denied access to specialized care and technology

They claim that this situation is the natural result of putting politicians in charge of health care, as the policies tend to maximize the number of voters serviced rather than achieving the goals of equality.

Trends in national systems 

The authors explain that most European countries with a national health care system have introduced market based reforms and relied on the private sector to reduce costs and increase the availability and effectiveness of health care.  Some examples include

 the NHS has begun treating patients in private hospitals and contracting with private health care providers
 the Canadian health care system spends over a billion dollars annually on U.S. medical care
 Sweden has introduced reforms to allow more than forty percent of all heal care services to be delivered privately

Goals of the book 

The authors state that the goal of the book is to dispel myths about health care as delivered in countries with national health insurance.  Further, they desired to explain why the American system is bad, why the nationalized systems are worse, and how to reform the American system without making the same mistake made by many other countries.

Myths about government health care

Right to health care 

According to the book, citizens in countries with national health care systems do not have an entitlement to health care. (See also Accuracy below). The book claims that the only country in the world that provides an entitlement to any health care service is the United States, whose citizens are legally entitled to kidney dialysis treatment; that citizens of other countries are not entitled to any particular treatment; and that while many citizens under national health care systems are allowed to wait in line for services, they are not even entitled to hold a place in line, as other patients may jump the queue.

All these claims are highly dubious and are not sustantiable because clearly there are very many cases where all citizens in other countries with national health care systems that are entitled to a wide range of health care services (not just dialysis). The UK has many examples of guaranteed maximum wait times (e.g. 2 weeks to see a specialist for a suspected cancer for example).

Equality under national systems 

The book claims that the elderly, minorities, and rural areas are all discriminated against in national systems and that the systems do not make care available based on need.

The British National Health Service was championed in 1950s as a way to end inequalities in health care.  After thirty years the Black Report found inequality had not changed, and after fifty years the Acheson Report found that it had widened. Furthermore, health care quality in different parts of Britain varies greatly, with higher quality care being found in the wealthier areas.

Large geographic disparity in health care has been observed in Canada as well, where the amount of money spent on urban patients was many times larger than that spent on rural patients.  High-profile Canadian patients such as politicians and the wealthy enjoy more frequent services, shorter waiting times, and greater choice in specialists.

The book claims that national health care systems make treatment available on the basis of need rather than ability to pay is also discussed as a myth.  While British NHS gives preferential treatment to paying customers, such as foreigners, many Britons opt to pay out of pocket for private services in order to avoid waiting for public health care.

Quality of health care 

Priorities do not go towards having the greatest impact on health. Outcomes of national systems  are of lower quality.  Modern technology is less available under national systems.  Prescription drugs are less available under national systems.

The authors contend that the United States' high infant mortality and mediocre life expectancy are not indicative of the quality of health care.  In the latter case, they note that while Japan has a longer life expectancy, Japanese Americans enjoy the same long life expectancy.  Similarly, infant mortality among Asians is low in Asian countries and in the US.

The United States has a better survival rate for prostate cancer and breast cancer than most industrialized countries.

The authors point out that access to modern medical technology is better in the United States than in countries with national health care systems.

Costs and efficiency 

Administrative costs, costs to patients, and unnecessary care go up while efficiency goes down.
Citizens under national health care system do not get more preventative care than Americans.
The overhead of managed care systems in the US is less than that of national systems.

A national system would not improve America's international competitiveness in industry.

Costs of prescription drugs are comparable in national systems and in the US.

Public opinion 

Public opinion of national health care has decreased rapidly since its inception in various countries.

Reform 

Large organizations such as car manufacturers, cities, or states do not need federal action to implement single payer systems.

Proposed reforms for the American health care system 

The proposal to reform the American health care system is to restructure the social safety net so that it rewards people who take care of their own health care needs while providing disincentives for those who rely on the safety net.  The goal is to make it so that the economic impact of a person's choice to take care of themselves or to use the safety net is economically neutral to the rest of society.

See also 

 socialized medicine
 single payer
 publicly funded health care
 health care system

External links 

 
 http://www.cato.org/pubs/pas/html/pa532/pa532index.html - One analysis which the book is based upon.

References 

Healthcare reform in the United States